The Pangti Village is  one of the biggest village among the Lothas. Pangti Village is located in Sungro Circle of Wokha District. A 156 km north from the  State Capital i.e. Kohima.

According to 2011 Census, the rate of Pangti was 77.13%, whose male literacy rate stands at 84.40% and  female literacy rate was 71.02%.

The Pangti Village is believed to have been established sometimes in the most last part of 1100 A.D or early part of 1200 A.D, during which time, the migration had taken place all over  India. The legendary establishment of the village relate back to "LUNGKHUM JUNG" Village, between Wokha Village and Koio Village when it was compeld to be dissolved/abandoned due to wild tiger.  The village was established with a  maximum of 12 clans where no such various clans exists in the other Lotha areas during that period mainly

i) Shitiri ii) Ngullie iii) Humtsoe iv) Kithan v) Odyui vi) Kikon vii) Patton viii) Jami ix) Murry x) Merry xi) Tsopoe xii) Yanthan.

To this day, 12 clans of Pangti Village is signified during wedding ceremonies called "HANLAM".

Pangti Village is the biggest village in the Lotha's area since  1904. Pangti is the only village in Lotha area who resisted the British domination and fought with the British forces led by Captain John Butler, fatally wounding him in the ensuing fight. The Pangti Village is also one of the bravest village in Lotha area even during headhunting times. This village still has a memorable stone measuring about 5.3 feet called 'LONGSIO', where our forefathers used (till 1930) while delivering both criminal and civil justice.

Pangti Village is also a place where the division of muddy soil and sandy soil is distinctly divided. Agriculture was the principal occupation of the people but with the establishment of Doyang Hydro Electric Project (DHEP), 50% of the village economy was shot up through fishing. Pangti Village also happen to be an important spot for Amur Falcon. Pangti Village has drawn Global attention by protecting millions of Amur Falcon that roost here in Pangti for two months from Mongolia to South Africa. The village had organised a welcome Programme for the mass release of the Amur Falcon on 1 October 2014. As of now, Pangti Village has been receiving members of visitors, locals, international and national visitors. According to the record being kept by the Amur Falcon Roosting Area Union Pangti (AFRAUP), the village has been nominated for India Biodiversity Award and earned recognition as the "Falcon Capital of the World".

Demographics
Pangti is located in Sungro Circle of Wokha District, Nagaland with total 1209 families residing. Pangti has a population of 7825 of which 3826 are males while 3999 are females as per Population Census 2011.

See also
 The Pangti Story

References

Villages in Wokha district